"Emma" is a 1974 song by the British soul band  Hot Chocolate. Written by band members Errol Brown (vocals) and Tony Wilson (music), the song address themes of suicide, early death and lost childhood. Brown's lyrics celebrate his recently passed mother. Their rawness was developed after the producer Mickie Most asked him for further "depth and darkness".

Emma reached number 3 in the UK Singles Chart and number 8 in the US Billboard Hot 100 chart.

Lyrics 
The song details the love of the (nameless) singer and a girl called Emmalene from the age of five, through a wedding at 17 until her suicide at an unspecified later date.  Emma it seems wanted to be a "movie queen" but could never find the breaks and eventually kills herself because "I just can't keep on living on dreams no more."

Chart history

Weekly charts

Year-end charts

Certifications

Cover versions
Earth Quake recorded a cover version for their 1977 album, Leveled.
The Sisters of Mercy started performing the song live in 1983. The studio version was released on the b-side of the 12" version of their 1988 single, "Dominion", and on the 2006 re-release of the album, Floodland. A much-bootlegged alternate version from a 1984 John Peel radio session was officially released in 2021 on the "BBC Sessions 1982–1984" compilation.
Urge Overkill recorded a version for 1990 Touch and Go Records release, The Supersonic Storybook.

References

External links
The Sisters of Mercy: Emma (Peel Session)

Hot Chocolate (band) songs
1974 songs
1974 singles
1975 singles
Songs about suicide
Songs written by Errol Brown
Song recordings produced by Mickie Most
The Sisters of Mercy songs
Urge Overkill songs
Big Tree Records singles
RAK Records singles
Teenage tragedy songs
Songs written by Tony Wilson (musician)